The 2019 North Miami mayoral election happened on May 14, 2019 in North Miami, Florida. The election was not partisan, although all of the candidates were Democrats. Philippe Bien-Aime was elected with 51.94% of the vote and 3,167 votes and narrowly prevented a runoff.

Candidates
Philippe Ben-Aime
Mac-Kinely Lauriston
Hector Medina
Danielle C.J. Beauvais

Results

References 

2019
2019 United States mayoral elections
2019 Florida elections
May 2019 events in the United States